Edward Chichester, 4th Marquess of Donegall (11 June 1799 – 20 January 1889), was a clergyman who late in life became an Irish peer. From 1831 until October 1883, he was known as The Very Rev. Lord Edward Chichester. He was the son of The 2nd Marquess of Donegall.

Born in Great Cumberland Place, Westminster, Chichester was educated at Eton and Trinity College, Dublin (TCD), where he graduated BA in 1822.

As a younger son, he became a minister of the Church of Ireland and served as Dean of Raphoe from 1831 to 1871. In 1853, his older brother's only surviving son, Frederick Richard Chichester, Earl of Belfast (1827–1853), died unmarried in Naples, leaving Lord Edward as the heir presumptive to the marquessate. In October 1883, at the age of 84, he finally succeeded his 86-year-old elder brother and became The 4th Marquess of Donegall. He died six years later in St Leonards-on-Sea, Sussex, and was buried in Kensal Green Cemetery, London.

On 21 September 1821, he married Amelia Spread Deane O'Grady, the third daughter of Henry Deane O'Grady by his marriage to Dorcas Spread. They had five children:
George Augustus Hamilton (27 June 1822 – 13 May 1904)
Annabella Augusta, who on 23 July 1844 married The 9th Earl Ferrers, and was the mother of The 10th Earl Ferrers (1847–1912)
Dorcas Juliana Fanny
Henry Fitzwarine (born 11 September 1834)
Adolphus John Spencer Churchill (born 18 December 1836), who married Mary, the only child of Robert Peel Dawson, of Moyola Park, Castledawson, and died in 1901. He was the father of Robert Chichester and grandfather of The Baron Moyola, Prime Minister of Northern Ireland 1969–1971, and of Sir Robin Chichester-Clark.

A large part of the Donegall estates was not entailed and in 1883 were inherited by the 3rd Marquess's only surviving child, Harriet Augusta Anna Seymourina, the wife of The 8th Earl of Shaftesbury.

References

External links

1799 births
1889 deaths
People educated at Eton College
Alumni of Trinity College Dublin
Deans of Raphoe
Ordained peers
Church of Ireland priests
Burials at Kensal Green Cemetery
Edward
4
19th-century Irish Anglican priests